Sandra Martins Cavalcanti de Albuquerque (30 August 1925 – 11 March 2022) was a Brazilian politician, linguist, and academic. She was a deputy from 1987 to 1995. Cavalcanti died on 11 March 2022, at the age of 96.

References

1925 births
2022 deaths
People from Belém
Linguists from Brazil
Brazilian academics
National Democratic Union (Brazil) politicians
National Renewal Alliance politicians
Brazilian Labour Party (current) politicians
Liberal Front Party (Brazil) politicians
Progressistas politicians
Members of the Chamber of Deputies (Brazil) from Rio de Janeiro (state)
Members of the Legislative Assembly of Rio de Janeiro
Brazilian women in politics
Commanders of the Order of Prince Henry
Pontifical Catholic University of Rio de Janeiro alumni
Academic staff of the Pontifical Catholic University of Rio de Janeiro